Back Roads is the 1999 novel by the American writer Tawni O'Dell, and was chosen as an Oprah's Book Club selection in March 2000.

Plot introduction
Harley Altmyer, a nineteen-year-old, has to care for his three sisters as his mother is in jail for killing his abusive father. Living in the coal town of Laurel Falls in backwoods Western Pennsylvania, he lusts after a mother of two who lives down the lane.

Plot summary
Harley Altmyer should be in college drinking beer and chasing girls. He should be freed from his stifling coal town with its lack of jobs and no sense of humor. Instead he's marooned in the Pennsylvania backwoods caring for his three younger sisters after the shooting death of his physically abusive father and the arrest of his mother.

Life is further complicated when he develops an obsession with the sexy, melancholic mother of two down the road. Family secrets and unspoken truths threaten to consume him as his obsession deepens and she responds unearthing a series of staggering surprises. In the face of each unexpected revelation and through every wrenching ordeal, Harley does the best he can to hold it all together. Harley's story is ultimately a search for his own self-worth as he slowly comes to realize that survival is a talent.

Film adaptation
In 2011, it was announced that a film adaptation of the book would be directed by Adrian Lyne. However, the film never made it into production.

In late 2015, it was announced that Alex Pettyfer and his producing partner Craig Robinson who set up Upturn Productions in 2015 with the intent of securing literary works that could be made into film or television, secured the rights for a film adaptation of the book. The film, Back Roads went into production in March 2017, with Pettyfer also serving as its director. The film stars Pettyfer as Harley Altmyer, Jennifer Morrison as Callie Mercer, Juliette Lewis as Bonnie Altmyer, Nicola Peltz as Amber Altmyer, and Robert Patrick as Chief Mansour.

References

External links
 Author's website

2000 American novels
Novels set in Pennsylvania
Viking Press books
2000 debut novels